Desmodorida is an order of nematodes belonging to the class Adenophorea.

Families:
 Ceramonematidae
 Choniolaimidae
 Chromadoridae
 Comesomatidae
 Cyatholaimidae
 Desmodoridae
 Draconematidae
 Epsilonematidae
 Etmolaimidae
 Microlaimidae
 Monoposthiidae
 Richtersiidae
 Selachinematidae
 Spiriniidae
 Xennellidae

References

Nematodes